Spyridium thymifolium, commonly known as thyme-leaved spyridium, is a species of flowering plant in the family Rhamnaceae and is endemic to the south-east of South Australia. It is a small shrub with egg-shaped to almost round leaves, and heads of woolly-hairy flowers.

Description
The upper surface of the leaves is glabrous and the lower surface covered with greyish, woolly hairs. Flowering occurs from September to February.

Taxonomy
Spyridium thymifolium was first formally described in 1858 by Siegfried Reissek in the journal Linnaea from specimens collected by Ferdinand von Mueller, near Encounter Bay in 1847. The specific epithet (thymifolium) means "thyme-leaved".

Distribution
Spyridium thymifolium occurs in the Southern Lofty and Kangaroo Island botanical regions of south-eastern South Australia.

References

thymifolium
Rosales of Australia
Flora of South Australia
Plants described in 1858